Passion and Warfare is the second studio album by guitarist Steve Vai, released on May 22, 1990 through Relativity and Epic Records. It has been certified Gold by the RIAA.

Background
Passion and Warfare was written based on a series of dream sequences that Vai had when he was younger, and in the guitar music book of the album, Vai sums it up as "Jimi Hendrix meets Jesus Christ at a party that Ben Hur threw for Mel Blanc". It was all recorded in The Mothership studio at his home in the Hollywood Hills, a  building in which his guitar parts for Whitesnake's 1989 album Slip of the Tongue were also recorded. Whitesnake frontman David Coverdale has small spoken parts on the album; Coverdale, Adrian Vandenberg and Rudy Sarzo are credited with backing vocals. Vai states that planning the album started as early as 1982, but was shelved after joining the David Lee Roth band and not picked up again until parting ways with Roth in 1989.

Recording methods
Vai utilized many unusual recording techniques on the album. For what would come to be one of his most popular songs to date, "For the Love of God", he fasted for ten days and recorded the song on the fourth day of the fast. "Blue Powder" was originally recorded in 1986 as a showcase track for Carvin, using their X-100B amplifier, and given away with Guitar Player magazine in flexi disc format. Vai was introduced to Carvin by his mentor Frank Zappa, who had also used the X-100B. The drums were subsequently re-recorded for the album. The equipment used to record Passion and Warfare was: Ibanez JEM and Universe guitars; Charvel Green Meanie guitar; Marshall JCM900 and Carvin X-100B amplifiers; ADA MP-1 preamplifier; Boss DS-1 distortion pedal; Eventide H3000 harmonizer; Lexicon 480L. Like many other releases by Vai, the album is largely instrumental, with only spoken word pieces being featured in terms of vocals, which are performed by many guests.

Legacy
The song "For the Love of God" is available for download for the 2007 video game Guitar Hero III: Legends of Rock, and was voted the 29th best solo of all time by a readers' poll in Guitar World magazine.

In 2016, Vai embarked on the Passion and Warfare 25th Anniversary World Tour, where he played the album in its entirety for the first time.

Track listing

Personnel

Steve Vai – guitar, Eventide H3000, keyboard (tracks 1, 3, 5, 7, 11), bass (tracks 1, 8, 9, 11), arrangement, engineering, production
David Rosenthal – keyboard (tracks 2, 9, 13), background vocals
Pia Maiocco (credited as Pia Vai) – keyboard on one chord (track 4)
Bob Harris – keyboard (track 10), background vocals
Chris Frazier – drums (tracks 1–5, 8, 10, 11, 13)
Tris Imboden – drums (tracks 7, 9)
Stuart Hamm – bass (tracks 2–5, 7, 10, 13)
Nancy Fagen – "vocals & hysteria" (track 8)
Jamie Firlotte – boy vocals (track 8)
David Coverdale – background vocals
Rudy Sarzo – background vocals
Adrian Vandenberg – background vocals
Pascal Fillet – background vocals
Laurel Fishman – background vocals
Lillian Vai – background vocals
Pam Vai – background vocals
Joel Kaith – background vocals
Corky Tanassy – background vocals
Jamie Kornberg – background vocals
Lauren Kornberg – background vocals
Corinne Larue – background vocals
Famin' – background vocals
Darla Albright – background vocals
Laura Gross – background vocals
Rupert Henry – background vocals
Suzanna Harris – background vocals
Julian Angel Vai – background vocals
Pascal Fillet – mixing
Bernie Grundman – mastering

Charts

Weekly charts

Certifications

References

External links
Steve Vai "Passion And Warfare" at Guitar Nine

Steve Vai albums
1990 albums
Relativity Records albums
Epic Records albums
Progressive metal albums by American artists